Rostin González (born 14 February 1964) is a Venezuelan former basketball player who competed in the 1992 Summer Olympics.

References

1964 births
Living people
Venezuelan men's basketball players
1990 FIBA World Championship players
Olympic basketball players of Venezuela
Basketball players at the 1992 Summer Olympics
20th-century Venezuelan people